Ethmia julia is a moth in the family Depressariidae. It is found in Puerto Rico and the Florida Keys.

The ground color of the forewings is white, tinged with pale brownish gray in the costal area, more broadly so towards the end of the cell and less conspicuously so over the remainder of the wing, or evenly over the whole wing. The markings are round, blackish dots which are more or less uniform in size. The ground color of the hindwings is translucent white, becoming brownish distally.

References

Moths described in 1973
julia